Maria Vladimirovna Mukhortova (born 20 November 1985) is a Russian pair skater. With former partner Maxim Trankov, she is the 2008 European silver medalist, a five-time Grand Prix medalist (including one gold medal at Trophée Eric Bompard), 2005 World Junior champion, 2004 Junior Grand Prix Final champion, and 2007 Russian national champion. In her early career, she competed with Egor Golovkin and Pavel Lebedev. She also competed one season with Jérôme Blanchard.

Personal life 
Mukhortova was born in Saint Petersburg but began skating in her father's hometown of Lipetsk when she was 6 years old. She became attracted to pair skating, however, there were no related opportunities in Lipetsk so her mother took her back to Saint Petersburg when she was thirteen.

Career

Early career
Mukhortova and Maxim Trankov trained in the same practice group under coaches Ludmila Velikova and Nikolai Velikov, but with different partners. Mukhortova first competed with Pavel Lebedev during the 2001–02 and the 2002–03 season, skating with him on the ISU Junior Grand Prix and finishing fourth at the 2002 and 2003 World Junior Championships. The pair had frequent arguments but due to good results, Mukhortova initially declined to switch partners, however, a year later in 2003, she accepted Trankov's suggestion to skate together.

Partnership with Trankov
In their first season together, they won the bronze medal at the Junior Grand Prix Final and the 2004 World Junior Championships. The following season, they competed on both the Grand Prix and Junior Grand Prix and won the 2005 World Junior Championships. In the 2005–06 Olympic season, they were assigned to the 2006 World Championships after Tatiana Totmianina / Maxim Marinin withdrew. They placed 12th in their debut at the event.

After the 2005–06 season, Mukhortova and Trankov switched coaches to Tamara Moskvina. In August 2006, Artur Dmitriev became their coach and in December 2006 they moved to Oleg Vasiliev.

In the 2006–07 season, Mukhortova and Trankov won the 2007 Russian Nationals, but were forced to miss the Europeans after she suffered an injury in practice. They returned in time for the 2007 Worlds, moving up one place to 11th. The following season, they won the silver medal at the 2008 Europeans and finished 7th at the 2008 Worlds. They had to take a short break in the middle of their long program at Worlds because Trankov was suffering from swelling in his arm, but returned to complete their skate after some alterations to his costume.

In the 2008-09 season, Mukhortova and Trankov qualified for their first Grand Prix Final, won a bronze medal at the 2009 European Championships, and moved up to 5th place at the World Championships.

For the 2009-10 season, the pair was assigned to the 2009 Trophée Eric Bompard, where they set a new overall personal best score and defeated two-time world champions Aliona Savchenko & Robin Szolkowy. Their second Grand Prix event was the 2009 Skate Canada where they placed second. They won another bronze medal at the 2010 European Championships but finished a disappointing seventh at the 2010 Winter Olympic Games. At the 2010 World Championships held in Turin, Italy, in March 2010 they finished in 4th place. Shortly thereafter, the pair ended their partnership.

Partnership with Blanchard 
In May 2010, it was announced that she had teamed up with Jérôme Blanchard to compete for Russia. At the 2011 Russian Championships, they finished 7th overall. In February 2011, their coach Oleg Vasiliev said they had taken some time off due to funding issues. On March 4, Vasiliev confirmed their partnership had ended; Mukhortova would consider competing with a new partner or move into show skating. Mukhortova joined the Russian Ice Stars in 2011.

Programs

With Blanchard

With Trankov

With Lebedev

Results

With Blanchard

With Trankov

With Lebedev

References

External links

 
 
 

Russian female pair skaters
1985 births
Living people
Figure skaters from Saint Petersburg
Olympic figure skaters of Russia
Figure skaters at the 2010 Winter Olympics
European Figure Skating Championships medalists
World Junior Figure Skating Championships medalists
Universiade medalists in figure skating
Universiade silver medalists for Russia
Universiade bronze medalists for Russia
Medalists at the 2003 Winter Universiade
Competitors at the 2005 Winter Universiade